The Shops at Mary Brickell Village is a lifestyle center located in the Brickell neighborhood of Miami, Florida. It has become a very popular downtown destination through bringing new stores and eateries to the area.

Mary Brickell Village is served by the Miami Metrorail at Brickell Station and by the Metromover.

Gallery

See also
Miami Avenue

External links
The Shops at Mary Brickell Village official website
The Draku Sushi official website
Jimmy Johns official website
Eyetrust Vision official website
The Sudio LX official website
The Oceanaire Seasfood official website

Buildings and structures in Miami
Shopping malls in Miami-Dade County, Florida
Shopping malls established in 2006
Tourist attractions in Miami